Pandemonium EP is an EP, released by In Legend, a band from vocalist and pianist Bastian Emig, mostly known as the drummer from the German a cappella metal band Van Canto.

Track listing

Personnel 
In Legend
Daniel Wicke - bass guitar
Bastian Emig – drums, lyrics, music, piano, producer, vocals

Crew
Charlie Bauerfeind – producer
Jürgen Lusky – mastering
Stefan Schmidt – producer

2010 EPs
In Legend albums